"Hold an Old Friend's Hand", released in Japan as , is the title track to Tiffany's second album Hold an Old Friend's Hand. It was the third single released from the album. The song is a cover, originally performed by Brenda Patterson in 1973, and written by Donna Weiss (who co-wrote the song, "Bette Davis Eyes").

Song information
By the summer of 1989, Tiffany's popularity was dwindling in the United States and Europe. The American leg of her "Hold an Old Friend's Hand World Tour" ended up being headlined by New Kids on the Block, meaning Tiffany was the supporting artist. In Asia, however, Tiffany and the tour were more popular than ever. Tiffany attempted to make the song a hit by performing it on several U.S. TV shows, but unfortunately, the song failed to have any impact on the U.S. charts, managing only a number 37 peak on the adult contemporary chart.

Track listings and formats
7" single and cassette single
 "Hold an Old Friend's Hand"
 "Ruthless"

Charts

References

External links      

Tiffany Darwish songs
1989 singles
MCA Records singles
1974 songs
Songs written by Donna Weiss